The first Athlete of the Year award in the United States was initiated by the Associated Press (AP) in 1931. At a time when women in sports were not given the same recognition as men, the AP offered a male and a female athlete of the year award to either a professional or amateur athlete. The awards are voted on annually by a panel of AP sports editors from across the United States, covering mainly American sports. As a result, a large majority of the winners have been Americans. However, non-Americans are also eligible for the honor and have won on a few occasions.

AP Athlete of the Year

Multiple Awards

AP Athlete of the Decade

Footnotes

Notes
 Adapted from the article Associated Press Athlete of the Year, from Wikinfo, licensed under the GNU Free Documentation License.

1931 establishments in the United States
American sports trophies and awards
Awards established in 1931
Most valuable player awards
United S
Sports trophies and awards
Associated Press awards